William Forster McCord (5 October 1837 – 14 April 1898) was a member of the Queensland Legislative Assembly.

Biography
McCord was born at Clonturk, County Longford, Ireland, the son of Charles McCord and his wife Martha (née Foster). He was educated in Longford and travelled to the United States with his father before arriving in New South Wales in 1857. After his arrival he established Coonambula Station at Eidsvold in what had now become Queensland in 1863 and also acquired the Cania run.

On 17 January 1871 he married Emilie Beatrice Wall and together had three sons and three daughters. McCord died in April 1898 at the Coonambula Station and was buried in the Gayndah Cemetery.

Public career
McCord was the Chairman of the Eidsvold Divisional Board from 1880 until 1898. At the 1896 Queensland colonial election, he won the seat of Burnett in the Queensland Legislative Assembly. He held the seat until his death two years later.

Notes

References
 The late Mr. M'Cord, M.L.A., The Brisbane Courier, (Wednesday, 27 April 1898), p.7.
 Anon (1895), "The Ceratodus: A German Scientist's Work, The Queenslander, (Saturday, 30 March 1895), p.597.

1838 births
1898 deaths
19th-century Australian politicians
Members of the Queensland Legislative Assembly